The Ministry of Environment and Fight Against Climate Change (in French: Ministère  de l’Environnement et de la Lutte contre les changements climatiques or MELCC) is responsible for environmental policy and land development in the province of Quebec. The ministry is also responsible for implementation of the provincial government's sustainable development plan, of which all provincial government agencies and organizations are party.

The current minister is Benoit Charette.

Notes and references

External links
 Official website

Sustainable Development|Sustainable Development
Quebec